This list of tallest bridges includes bridges with a structural height of at least . The  of a bridge is the maximum vertical distance from the uppermost part of a bridge, such as the top of a bridge tower, to the lowermost exposed part of the bridge, where its piers, towers, or mast pylons emerge from the surface of the ground or water. A separate list of highest bridges ranks bridges by deck height.

Structural height and deck height 
The difference between tall and high bridges can be explained in part because some of the highest bridges are built across deep valleys or gorges. For example, (as of 1 July 2020) the Duge Bridge is the highest bridge in the world, but only the eleventh tallest. This bridge spans a deep river gorge.

The Millau Viaduct is a cable-stayed bridge that is both tall (in structural height) and high (in deck height). The Millau Viaduct is (as of 9 January 2023) the tallest bridge, but only the thirtieth highest bridge in the world.

Completed

Under construction

See also
 List of highest bridges
 List of tallest towers
 List of tallest buildings and structures
 List of tallest buildings and structures by country

Notes

References

Other references are, as a principle, located in the articles about the bridges.

Tallest
Bridges
Lists of construction records